Barahona Port or Port of Barahona is located in Barahona, Dominican Republic.

Overview

Port of Barahona was rebuilt in the 1950s by the United States.
The Harbor has three terminals, which are called Terminal Consorcio Azucarero Central and Terminal EGE HAINA in one side.
Muelle de Barahona (Barahona Harbor) and muelle del Central Azucarero (Sugar Mill Central Harbor).

This port is not very active; in 2008 it received only 50 boats with different kind of activities. 

The port handles individual cargo operations, exporting minerals and oils.

Port information

 Location:  // MGRS 19Q BA 789 144
 Local time: UTC−4 
 Weather/climate/prevailing winds:  From May 15 until September 15
 Climate: mostly sunny, tropical. Hurricane season runs from June to November
 Prevailing winds: direction ENE–ESE
 Average temperature range: 28–30 °C

See also 
 List of ports and harbours of the Atlantic Ocean

References 
 Barahona Port (Spanish)

Barahona
Urban planning in the Dominican Republic
Buildings and structures in Barahona Province